was a private junior college in Nobeoka, Miyazaki, Japan, established in 1967. The present name was adopted in 1991. Originally a women's college, it began admitting male students in 1997. It closed down in 2011.

External links
 Official website 

Educational institutions established in 1967
Private universities and colleges in Japan
Universities and colleges in Miyazaki Prefecture
Japanese junior colleges